Mollaməhərrəmli (also, Mollamagerramli, Molla-Magerramlu, and Molli-Magerramlu) is a village and municipality in the Fuzuli District of Azerbaijan.  It has a population of 841.

References 

Populated places in Fuzuli District